Arbanitis crispus is a species of armoured trap-door spider in the family Idiopidae, and is endemic to New South Wales. 

It was first described by Władysław Kulczyński in 1908 as Dyarcyops birói.  In 2017, Michael Rix and others transferred it to the genus, Arbanitis. The species epithet honours Ludovico Biro from whose collection it was described.

References

Idiopidae
Spiders described in 1908
Spiders of Australia
Fauna of New South Wales
Taxa named by Władysław Kulczyński